Kaushalyavati Devi or Kaushalyawati Devi was a queen consort of Gorkha.

Her father, Gundharva Sen, was a Raja of Palpa and Binayakpur. He added considerably to his lands, with the help of the Rajas of Gulmi and Kanchi. She was the second wife of King Nara Bhupal Shah, and the mother of Prithvi Narayan Shah, who was the king of unified Nepal from 1768 to 1775 C.E., She gave birth to Prithvi Narayan Shah prematurely, after 7 months of pregnancy.

References

Nepalese monarchs
Nepalese royalty
Nepalese queens consort
People of the Nepalese unification
People from Palpa District
18th-century Nepalese people
Nepalese Hindus

ne:रानी कौसल्यावती